Pinna Nesbit (November 26, 1896 – March 31, 1950) was a Canadian silent film actress. She was married three times and had an affair with King Edward VIII, when he was Prince of Wales. Her first husband, Harley Knoles, directed several of her films.

She was the daughter of Captain William A. Nesbit, a British army officer stationed in Toronto, Ontario, Canada.

Nesbit was married to haberdasher Freddie Cruger at the time of her affair with the Prince of Wales. Later she was married to John Gaston.

Filmography

References

External links 

1896 births
1950 deaths
Canadian people of British descent
Actresses from Halifax, Nova Scotia
Canadian silent film actresses
Canadian emigrants to the United States
Canadian film actresses